American electropop band Passion Pit has recorded forty-six songs across three studio albums, three extended plays, and two guest features. The band was formed in 2007, when former guitarist Ian Hultquist persuaded Michael Angelakos and other Boston musicians to play the songs from a mixtape Angelakos had made for his girlfriend. Their live performances soon caught the attention of Frenchkiss Records, who signed the group to the label shortly afterwards. In September 2008, the band released their first recorded material with the six track extended play Chunk of Change, which included the single "Sleepyhead". Following the success of Chunk of Change, the band released their debut studio album Manners in May 2009. The album had eleven songs, and featured a re-recorded version of "Sleepyhead", as well as three singles: "The Reeling", "To Kingdom Come", and "Little Secrets".

In 2010, Passion Pit signed to Columbia Records, and recorded cover versions of The Cranberries song "Dreams", and The Smashing Pumpkins' song "Tonight, Tonight". The group's second studio album, Gossamer, was released in July 2012. The album had twelve songs, including five singles: "Take a Walk", "I'll Be Alright", "Constant Conversations", "Carried Away", and "Cry Like a Ghost". Passion Pit ended the year by recording the song "Where I Come From" for The Twilight Saga: Breaking Dawn – Part 2 soundtrack in November.

In September 2013, Passion Pit released the four track extended play Constant Conversations, which included a cover of "Carry On" by Fun. The group would not release new material until February 2015, when they collaborated with Madeon to record the single "Pay No Mind", which appeared on Madeon's debut studio album Adventure. Passion Pit would then release their third studio album Kindred in April. The album had ten songs, including three singles: "Lifted Up (1985)", "Where the Sky Hangs", and "Until We Can't (Let's Go)".

Songs

References

Notes

Footnotes

Passion Pit
Passion Pit songs